Timi Max Elšnik (born 29 April 1998) is a Slovenian footballer who plays as a central midfielder for Olimpija Ljubljana. Besides Slovenia, he has played in England.

Club career

Derby County
During his first season at Derby County, Elšnik initially played for the under-18 team before progressing to the under-21 squad. At the end of the 2015–16 season, he was named the club's Scholar of the Year. Shortly after signing a new three-year contract with the club in August 2016, he made his first team debut as a substitute against Carlisle United in the EFL Cup, scoring twice in Derby's penalty shoot-out win. He was released by Derby in July 2019.

Swindon Town (loan)
On 31 August 2017, Elšnik signed on a season long loan for Swindon Town along with Derby teammate Kellan Gordon. Two days later, Elšnik made his Swindon debut during their 4–1 home defeat against Barnet, featuring for the entire 90 minutes.

Mansfield Town (loan)
On 31 August 2018, Elšnik signed on a season-long loan for Mansfield Town. Four days later, Elšnik made his Mansfield debut during their 2–1 away win against Lincoln City in the EFL Trophy, featuring for the entire 90 minutes.

On 30 October 2018, Elšnik was brought back into the Mansfield side as he started the game against Crewe Alexandra. Elsnik scored two goals ensuring a 3–0 win for Mansfield.

International career
Elšnik has represented Slovenia at under-17, under-18, under-19, and under-21 levels. He made his senior debut on 8 October 2021 in the 2022 FIFA World Cup qualification match against Malta, replacing Jasmin Kurtić late in the game.

Career statistics

Honours
Olimpija Ljubljana
Slovenian Cup: 2020–21

References

External links
 
 NZS profile 

Living people
1998 births
Slovenian footballers
Association football midfielders
Slovenian expatriate footballers
Slovenian expatriate sportspeople in England
Expatriate footballers in England
Derby County F.C. players
Swindon Town F.C. players
Mansfield Town F.C. players
Northampton Town F.C. players
NK Olimpija Ljubljana (2005) players
English Football League players
Slovenian PrvaLiga players
Slovenia youth international footballers
Slovenia under-21 international footballers
Slovenia international footballers